Lucia Beatriz Rothman-Denes (born February 17, 1943) is an Argentinian American microbiologist who is the A. J. Carlson Professor in the Department of Molecular Genetics at the University of Chicago. She is known for studying the regulation of transcription and host interactions that occur during bacterial virus infection. She was elected to the National Academy of Sciences (NAS) in 2014.

Early life and education 
Rothman-Denes was born in Buenos Aires in 1943 to Boris and Carmen Rothman. She studied at the University of Buenos Aires and graduated in 1964 with a licenciada degree in chemistry. She remained there for her graduate studies, earning a PhD in biochemistry in 1967. She worked at the Leloir Institute. Rothman-Denes completed a postdoctoral fellowship at the National Institutes of Health. She also spent time at the University of California, San Diego with E. Peter Geiduschek.

Research and career 
In 1967, Rothman-Denes was appointed to the faculty at the University of Chicago. She was made a Full Professor in 1984, and the A. J. Carlson Professor in 2015. She studies how bacterial viruses impact the molecular processes within a host. She uncovered mechanisms of transcription regulation through DNA structural transitions. Rothman-Denes combines biophysical, biochemical and structural characterisation techniques to understand gene expression at the level of transcription. She is particularly interested in DNA-dependent RNA polymerase.

Rothman-Denes' current work considers the mechanism at the onset of an injection, when proteins and genomes are injected into a host. She is also working on the characterisation of viral-encoded products that inhibit the essential function of the host. She studies the target of these viral-encoded products in an effort to design new antibiotics. She served on the board of governors of the American Society for Microbiology from 2000 to 2003.

Awards and honors 
 2001 Elected to the American Academy of Arts and Sciences
 2014 Elected to the National Academy of Sciences

Rothman-Denes holds several patents to protect her inventions, including novel RNA polymerases and transcription substrates.

References 

21st-century Argentine scientists
21st-century Argentine women
Argentine women scientists
University of Buenos Aires alumni
University of Chicago faculty
People from Buenos Aires
Members of the United States National Academy of Sciences
Fellows of the American Association for the Advancement of Science
Fellows of the American Academy of Arts and Sciences
Argentine microbiologists
Women microbiologists
20th-century Argentine scientists
20th-century Argentine women
20th-century American women scientists
21st-century American women scientists
Living people
1943 births
American women academics